"Safe and Sound" is a song by French electronic music duo Justice. It was released as the lead single from their third studio album, Woman (2016), on 13 July 2016. The song debuted and peaked on the French Singles Chart at number 48.

Background and release
Prior to the song's release, a user on social media site Reddit discovered "Safe and Sound" in a DJ set by Busy P, head of Ed Banger Records, through the Shazam mobile app. On 13 July 2016, "Safe and Sound" received its first radio airplay on DJ Annie Mac's radio show on BBC Radio 1. On the same day, the song was made available as a free download, in both MP3 and WAV formats, from Justice's website. After the song's release, many magazines and news websites made expectations for a new studio album to be released soon by the band.

Critical reception
"Safe and Sound" received positive reviews from critics. They often praised the song's disco-like structure and sound. Ryan Reed of Rolling Stone called the song "a psychedelic disco epic built on finger snaps, synth-strings, spastic jazz-fusion synths and one of the fiercest slap-bass grooves since Patrice Rushen's 1982 classic 'Forget Me Nots'." Lyndsey Havens of Consequence of Sound compared the song to Justice's hit song "D.A.N.C.E.", citing the "repetitive, hypnotic hook and airy vocals that sail over the song’s booming synth" as a reason why. She also complimented the duo's use of a funk-like bass and synthesized strings for the song. Allison Sadlier of Entertainment Weekly wrote that the song stays true to the duo's disco-reminiscent "modern techno-style" sound and "makes for [a] dance worthy listen."

In popular culture
The song appears in the Netflix program  Another Life at the end of episode 1.9, "Heart and Soul".

“Safe and Sound” also appears in the 2016 video game  Forza Horizon 3 along with D.A.N.C.E.

Track listing

Charts

References

Justice (band) songs
2016 singles
2016 songs